The Palais des Congrès Acropolis (formerly known as Parc Expo) is a convention center located in Nice, France.  It hosts various conventions, fairs, concerts, operas, productions of shows and exhibitions.

In 2012, Nice's Palais des Congrès Acropolis was the event venue for the 2012 World Figure Skating Championships. The facility also hosted the 1999 Davis Cup final, where the main convention was converted into a temporary tennis court.

References

External links

Homepage

Buildings and structures in Nice
Convention centers in France
Tourist attractions in Nice
1999 Davis Cup